Amos Sutton Hayden (September 17, 1813 in Youngstown, Ohio – September 10, 1880) was an American Restoration Movement preacher, hymn composer, writer, and educator. He wrote the Early History of the Disciples in the Western Reserve, Ohio in 1875. He was a founder and the first principal of Hiram College in Hiram, Ohio.

References

1813 births
1880 deaths
American hymnwriters
Members of Restoration Movement denominations
Writers from Youngstown, Ohio
19th-century American writers
Hiram College
People from Hiram, Ohio
19th-century American musicians
19th-century American male writers
19th-century American male musicians
Musicians from Youngstown, Ohio